Janine Berger (born 21 April 1996) is a German artistic gymnast. In 2012, she began competing among seniors and was selected for the 2012 Summer Olympics, where her team was placed ninth.

Individually she competed in the vault, uneven bars and floor exercise, but failed to reach the finals in the last two events. In floor exercise she scored 13.300 and ranked 47. In uneven bars she scored 12.866 and finished 57th. In the vault she performed a Rudi (handspring 1.5-twisting layout) and a double-twisting Tsukahara, with difficulty ratings of 6.3 and 6.0, respectively. Her first vault, officially named Chusovitina in the Code of Points but more commonly known as Rudi, had a good height and amplitude, but excessive piking of the hips in the final phase led to an uncontrolled landing. Berger finished fourth behind Russia's Maria Paseka. Her score was 15.016 is the 4th place final.

In early 2014, she returned to gymnastics after a year's break in 2013 following an injury. She won the vault competition at the Turnier De Meister World Cup in Cottbus, Germany.

In 2014 Janine participated in 2014 European Women's Artistic Gymnastics Championships and in vault finished 5th with a score of 14.416.

In 2014, she was diagnosed with an injury to the ACL (knee) after a bad landing. Until 2016 and early 2017 Janine has undergone several surgeries for treating the problems of her knees; but she is still hopeful about gymnastics and hopes to return, though she is also planning to go to university as well. Year 2016 was still plagued with injuries for Janine Berger. She missed Rio Olympics as a result. She reported via her Instagram account that she is still training and might return to competitions in 2018 or 2020.

References

External links
 

German female artistic gymnasts
1996 births
Living people
Olympic gymnasts of Germany
Gymnasts at the 2012 Summer Olympics
Competitors at the 2019 Summer Universiade
People from Dillingen an der Donau
Sportspeople from Swabia (Bavaria)